Tumbledown is a 2015 American romantic comedy film directed by Sean Mewshaw, written by Desiree Van Til, and starring Rebecca Hall, Jason Sudeikis, Dianna Agron, and Joe Manganiello. The film was released on February 5, 2016, by Starz Digital.

Premise 
A young widow (Rebecca Hall) falls for a New York writer (Jason Sudeikis) who comes to her hometown in rural Maine to investigate the death of her husband, a folk singer.

Cast 
 Rebecca Hall as Hannah Miles
 Jason Sudeikis as Andrew McCabe
 Dianna Agron as Finley
 Joe Manganiello as Curtis
 Griffin Dunne as Upton
 Richard Masur as Bruce Jespersen
 Blythe Danner as Linda Jespersen

Production 
On April 19, 2013, it was announced that Sean Mewshaw would direct the romantic comedy on the script of Desiree Van Til; producers would be Kristin Hahn of Indigo Films and Aaron L. Gilbert and Margot Hand of Bron Studios. Jason Sudeikis and Rose Byrne were set to play the lead roles, Sudeikis as a New York writer and Byrne as a young widow. Olivia Munn, Joe Manganiello, Blythe Danner, Michael McKean and Beau Bridges were also set to co-star in the film. On January 30, 2014, Rebecca Hall joined the cast of the film to play the female lead, replacing Byrne as the widow in the film. On March 31, 2014 Dianna Agron, Griffin Dunne and Richard Masur joined the ensemble cast, while filming was underway in Devens.

Filming 
In April 2013 the filming was set to begin in October in Vancouver, British Columbia. In addition to Vancouver, filmmaker Van Til looked at shooting in Maine, California and New York. Ultimately she settled on shooting in Massachusetts due to their “robust film incentive program”  which would help with the $4 million budget. According to the LA Times, “The Massachusetts Film Office touts a program offering filmmakers who spend more than $50,000 in the state a 25% tax credit to offset the costs of paying actors, building sets and other expenses. It's among the more competitive film incentive programs in the country.” 

So, In January 2014 the production was scheduled to begin in late March in Massachusetts. The shooting of the film began on March 23, 2014, in Princeton, Massachusetts. Filming also reportedly took place at New England Studios in Devens.

Release
The film premiered at the Tribeca Film Festival on April 18, 2015. It was released on February 5, 2016, by Starz Digital.

Reception
Tumbledown received generally positive reviews. On Rotten Tomatoes, the film has a rating of 70%, based on 37 reviews, with an average rating of 6.32/10. On Metacritic, the film has a score of 60 out of 100, based on 14 critics, indicating "mixed or average reviews".

References

External links 
 

2015 films
2015 directorial debut films
American romantic comedy films
2015 romantic comedy films
Films shot in Massachusetts
Films set in Maine
Bron Studios films
Films scored by Daniel Hart
2010s English-language films
2010s American films